Kutché is a studio album from Algerian artists Cheb Khaled and Safy Boutella. It is the only collaboration between the two artists. Khaled would later rise to be one of the most famous raï artists outside Algeria, while Safy Boutella would continue his career as a jazzman in Europe.

The album was re-released by Stern's Music and Intuition Music.

The title track Kutché is the cover of a popular Algerian song, originally named Moul el Koutchi. This name comes from the Spanish coche and indicates horse-drawn carriages used for the transport of people, now mainly tourists, in cities like Marrakech or Meknes. The lyrics are very allusive and can be interpreted in different ways.
La Camel is a cover of a Cheikha Rimitti song and Chebba is a cover of an Ahmed Zergui song.

Reception
AllMusic awarded the album with 4.5 stars and its review by Bob Tarte states: "Collaboration between Paris-based keyboard-whiz Safy Boutella and one of raï's most powerful voices sets tough standards for other discs".

Track listing
 "La Camel" – 5:33
 "Kutché" – 5:59
 "El Lela" – 5:02
 "Baroud" – 3:58
 "Chebba" – 5:48
 "Hana-Hana" – 5:26
 "Chab Rassi" – 5:04
 "Minuit" – 5:51

Personnel
Cheb Khaled – vocals, accordion, synthesizer solo, bendir
Safy Boutella – bass, synthesizer, keyboards, Linn 9000 programming, backing vocals, musical conception and arrangements
Nicolas Neidhardt - keyboards, synthesizers, programming
 Boffi Banengola – drums 
 Noureddine Boutella – guitar (tracks 1, 3, 4, 5 & 6) 
 Jean-Jacques Hertz – guitar (tracks 1, 3, 5, 6 & 8) 
 Raphaël Faÿs – acoustic guitar (track 4)
 Zouhi Gouja – oud (track 1)
 Cheb Kada – synthesizer solo (track 3)
 Allan Hoist – alto saxophone solo (track 3)
 Djaffar Bensetti - trumpet (tracks 3, 4 & 8)
 Dahey Abdelhakim, Mohamed Seif, Allah Benabderrezak – violin
 Samya – vocals (track 6)
 Amina Ben Mustapha – vocals (tracks 1 & 5)
 Atem Bidaoui – darbouka, tar

References

Khaled (musician) albums
1988 albums
Safy Boutella albums